Khalilabad may refer to:

Azerbaijan
Xəlilabad, village in Azerbaijan.

India
Khalilabad, India

Iran

Chaharmahal and Bakhtiari Province
Khalilabad, Milas, a village in Lordegan County
Khalilabad, Rig, a village in Lordegan County

East Azerbaijan Province
Khalilabad, East Azerbaijan, a village in Bonab County

Fars Province
Khalilabad, Fars, a village in Zarrin Dasht County

Hormozgan Province

Isfahan Province
Khalilabad, Isfahan, a village in Fereydunshahr County

Kerman Province
Khalilabad, Anbarabad, a village in Anbarabad County
Khalilabad, Kerman, a village in Kerman County
Khalilabad, Sirjan, a village in Sirjan County
Khalilabad, Sharifabad, a village in Sirjan County

Kermanshah Province
Khalilabad, Kermanshah, a village in Kangavar County

Khuzestan Province

Lorestan Province
Khalilabad, Delfan, a village in Lorestan Province, Iran

Markazi Province
Khalilabad, Markazi, a village in Khomeyn County

Razavi Khorasan Province
Khalilabad, Iran, a city in Razavi Khorasan Province, Iran
Khalilabad, Dargaz, a village in Razavi Khorasan Province, Iran
Khalilabad, Fariman, a village in Razavi Khorasan Province, Iran
Khalilabad, Joghatai, a village in Razavi Khorasan Province, Iran
Khalilabad, Khvaf, a village in Razavi Khorasan Province, Iran
Khalilabad, Torbat-e Jam, a village in Razavi Khorasan Province, Iran
Khalilabad County, in Iran

Sistan and Baluchestan Province
Khalilabad, Iranshahr, a village in Iranshahr County
Khalilabad, Nukabad, a village in Khash County

Yazd Province
Khalilabad, Ardakan, a village in Ardakan County
Khalilabad (31°47′ N 54°13′ E), Taft, a village in Taft County

Pakistan
Khalilabad, Pakistan

See also
Kalilabad